Oculogryphus shuensis, is a species of firefly beetles belonging to the family Lampyridae. It is endemic to China.

Body length of male is 6.7–7.1 mm. Body elongate oval and depressed. Head capsule and antennae black. Thoracic sternites yellowish brown. Elytra black and body yellowish brown.

References

Beetles described in 2014
Lampyridae
Taxa named by Michael S. Engel